This is a list of magazines marketed primarily for computer and technology enthusiasts or users. The majority of these magazines cover general computer topics or several non-specific subject areas, however a few are also specialized to a certain area of computing and are listed separately.

General magazines
These publications appeal to a broad audience and usually include content about computer hardware and software and  technology news. These magazines could also be called technology magazines because of the large amount of content about non-computer consumer electronics, such as digital audio player and mobile phones.

Bi-monthly

Component Developer Magazine (CODE)

Monthly

APC (Australia)
Computer Shopper (UK)
Computer Shopper (US)
Digit (India)
PC Magazine
PC Pro
PC World
PC Quest (India)
iX (magazine) (Germany)

Fortnightly

c't (Germany, Netherlands)
Computeractive (United Kingdom)

Weekly

Computer Weekly (United Kingdom)
Computerra (Russia)
Computing (United Kingdom)
Micro Mart (United Kingdom)

Online-only
Datamation, previously in print 1957–1998, the first computer magazine. (United States)

Topic-specific magazines
These publications are marketed towards people who are interested in a specific topic of computing.

Amiga

Amiga Computing (United Kingdom, United States) (discontinued)
Amiga Format (United Kingdom) (discontinued)

Macintosh

Call-A.P.P.L.E. (United States)
MacTech (United States)
MacFormat (United Kingdom)
MacLife (Germany)
MacLife, formally MacAddict (United States)
MacUser (United Kingdom)
Macworld (Australia, United States, Italy, Germany, Sweden, Spain, United Kingdom)

RISC OS/Acorn

Acorn User (United Kingdom) (discontinued)
Archive (United Kingdom)
The Micro User (United Kingdom) (discontinued)
Qercus (United Kingdom)

Web development

.net (United Kingdom)

Computer modification

Custom PC (United Kingdom)
Maximum PC (United States)
PC Extreme (United Kingdom) (discontinued)

Gaming

Internet

First Monday (Internet) (peer reviewed)
Internet Magazine (United Kingdom) (discontinued) Spider (Pakistan) (discontinued) Webuser (United Kingdom) (discontinued)

BusinesseWeek (United States)InformationWeek (United States)InfoWorld (United States)

MusicComputer Music (United Kingdom)

Mobile computingPC Today (United States)

Novice usersFirst Glimpse (United States)

 1980s computers 
The following magazines cover 1980s home computers such as the Amiga, Atari 8-bit, Commodore 64, ZX Spectrum or Amstrad CPC. Most of these magazines are now discontinued as the computers they discuss are now out of production.

Partworks
The following magazines were published as partworks:The Home Computer Advanced Course (United Kingdom) (1984–1985)The Home Computer Course (United Kingdom) (1983–1984)PC Ace (United Kingdom) (1999–2001)

Linux and open-source
The following magazines cover topics related to the Linux operating system (as well as other Unix based operating systems) and other forms of open-source/ free software. Some of these magazines are targeted at IT professionals (with an emphasis on the use of these systems in the workplace) whilst others are designed for home users.Free Software Magazine (Internet)Full CircleLinux Format (United Kingdom)Linux Gazette (Internet)Linux Journal (United States) (shutdown August 7, 2019)Linux Magazine (United Kingdom/Europe)Linux Magazine (United States)Linux User and Developer (United Kingdom)Linux Voice (United Kingdom)Linux Weekly News (Internet)Open Source For You (India)

Sales
The following magazines cover computer, peripheral, software and service distribution, through all their aspects (marketing, strategy, channel, retail or wholesale).Channel World, Belgium, Czech Republic, India, NetherlandsCRN Magazine, US, Europe and other countriesIT Bransjen, Norway

Academic journals
A number of journals are circulated in academic circles (normally associated with a governing body such as the Institute of Electrical and Electronics Engineers, IEEE). These may cover several different topics as well as computing and often deal with more technical aspects of hardware and software.ACM Computing Reviews (United States) (ACM)ACM Queue (United States) (ACM)ACM Transactions on Graphics (United States) (ACM)American Programmer (United States)C/C++ Users Journal (United States) (independent publisher, defunct)Computer (United States) (IEEE, Computer Society)Computer Graphics (United States) (ACM SIGGRAPH)Dr. Dobb's Journal (United States) (independent publisher, defunct)IEEE Internet Computing (United States) (IEEE, Computer Society)IEEE Intelligent Systems (United States) (IEEE, Computer Society)IEEE Micro (United States) (IEEE, Computer Society)IEEE MultiMedia (United States) (IEEE, Computer Society)IEEE Software (United States) (IEEE, Computer Society)Overload (United Kingdom) (ACCU)

Other, now defunct, computer-related magazines

 .info Ahoy! Boot Byte C (Finland)
 CD-ROM Today Compute! COMPUTE!'s Gazette Computer Decisions Creative Computing Electronics Today International, electronics magazine that also published early homebrew computer systems
 Family Computing (later Home Office Computing), home/educational-oriented magazine published by Scholastic, Inc.
 Games for Windows: The Official Magazine Hebdogiciel, French computing magazine from the 1980s
 Info Komputer (Indonesia)
 CHIP (India)
 IT-Branchen (Denmark)
 Kilobaud Microcomputing (United States)
 Microsystems New Computer Express (United Kingdom)
 Nibble PC Ace Personal Computer News (United Kingdom)
 Popular Computing Weekly (United Kingdom)
 The One The Rainbow RUN SunWorld, about Sun Microsystems computers (United States)
 UnixWorld, about Unix operating system (United States)
 Verbum, desktop publishing and computer art focused magazine of the 1990s
 Zero''

Computer magazine publishers

The following companies publish one or several computer related magazines. Some of these publishers produce computer magazines exclusively and most produce multiple magazines from this genre.

Future plc (United Kingdom)
Newsfield Publications (United Kingdom)
Next Media (Australia)
Sandhills Publishing Company (United States)

See also
 List of disk magazines
 List of engineering journals and magazines

References

External links
Businesswires list of IT magazines

 
Computer